Georges Othily (7 January 1944 – 18 December 2017) was a French Guianese politician who was elected to the French Senate in 1989. His biography of René Jadfard, René Jadfard ou l'éclair d'une vie, was published by Éditions caribéennes in 1989.

References 

1944 births
2017 deaths
People from Cayenne
Modern Left politicians
French Senators of the Fifth Republic
Presidents of the Regional Council of French Guiana
French Guianan politicians
French Guianan writers
French people of French Guianan descent
French male writers
Senators of French Guiana